This is a list of the main career statistics of tennis player Latisha Chan.

Performance timelines

Singles

Doubles

Mixed doubles

Significant finals

Grand Slam finals

Doubles: 4 (1 title, 3 runner-ups)

Mixed doubles: 4 (3 titles, 1 runner-up)

WTA 1000 finals

Doubles: 13 (9 titles, 4 runner-ups)

WTA career finals

Singles: 1 (runner-up)

Doubles: 59 (33 titles, 26 runner-ups)

WTA Challenger finals

Singles: 1 (runner-up)

Doubles: 2 (2 titles)

ITF Circuit finals

Singles: 22 (16–6)

Doubles: 23 (16–7)

Notes

References 

Chan, Latisha